Barau may refer to:

 Barau, German name for Bavorov, town in Strakonice District in the South Bohemian Region of the Czech Republic 
 Suleimanu Barau, 6th emir of Abuja
 Barau's petrel, medium-sized gadfly petrel from the family Procellariidae
 Barau-Satan, a minor demon in the Élus Coëns tradition of Martinez de Pasqually